Valpromide (marketed as Depamide by Sanofi-Aventis) is a carboxamide derivative of valproic acid used in the treatment of epilepsy and some affective disorders. It is rapidly metabolised (80%) to valproic acid (another anticonvulsant) but has anticonvulsant properties itself. It may produce more stable plasma levels than valproic acid or sodium valproate and may be more effective at preventing febrile seizures. However, it is over one hundred times more potent as an inhibitor of liver microsomal epoxide hydrolase. This makes it incompatible with carbamazepine and can affect the ability of the body to remove other toxins. Valpromide is no safer during pregnancy than valproic acid.

Valpromide is formed through the reaction of valproic acid and ammonia via an intermediate acid chloride.

In pure form, valpromide is a white crystalline powder and has a melting point 125–126 °C. It is soluble only in hot water. It is available on the market in some European countries.

See also
 Valproate pivoxil
 Valnoctamide
Carbromide
Ibrotamide
 M 25 [1186293-14-0] is also one of the compounds that has a reputation.

References
 The Medical Treatment of Epilepsy by Stanley R Resor. Published by Marcel Dekker (1991). .
 Hydrolysis in Drug and Prodrug Metabolism: Chemistry, Biochemistry, and Enzymology by Bernard Testa, Joachim M. Mayer (2003). .
 In Vitro Methods in Developmental Toxicology by Gary L Kimmel, Devendra M Kochhar, Baumann (1989). .

Anticonvulsants
GABA analogues
GABA transaminase inhibitors
Histone deacetylase inhibitors
Mood stabilizers
Carboxamides